Paradise Bay may refer to:

Paradise Bay (TV series)
Paradise Harbor, Antarctica
Paradise Bay, bay on Malta